Värm mer Öl och Bröd (Warm more Beer and Bread) is epistle No. 43 in the Swedish poet and performer Carl Michael Bellman's 1790 song collection, Fredman's Epistles. The epistle, dated 14 November 1771, is subtitled "Till Ulla Winblad, skrifven vid et ömt tilfälle" ("To Ulla Winblad, written at a sensitive occasion"). The source of the melody has not been traced.

The song details the preparations for Ulla Winblad's childbirth. It ends with the famous and ambiguous line "Masken dold i blomman bådar blommans död" ("The worm hidden in the flower bodes the flower's death"). The epistle is unusual, too, in being quiet and delicate rather than full of noisy humour. It has been described as among the most radical and innovative of Bellman's songs.

Context

Song

Music 

The song is mainly in  time, with a section in  time. The musicologist James Massengale notes that bars 9 to 12 resemble epistle No. 1's ("Sant va dä, ingen dricker") bars 11 to 14 (the pattern recurring also in epistle No. 59, "Hurra Courage, Bagage! God dag Bröder!"). The source of the melody has not been traced. It has 2 verses, each consisting of 15 lines. The rhyming pattern is ABBBA-CDDDCC-EEEA. The song is dated 14 November 1771.

Lyrics 

The song, subtitled "Till Ulla Winblad, skrifven vid et ömt tilfälle" ("To Ulla Winblad, written at a sensitive occasion"), describes the preparations for childbirth. The epistle was most likely inspired by the "real" Ulla Winblad, Maria Kristina Kiellström, who had a stillbirth in 1769.

Reception and legacy

The Bellman interpreter Thord Lindé writes that the preparations for childbirth form an unusual theme for a song, certainly unique in Bellman's work. In unhygienic 18th century Stockholm, childbirth was a risky event, both for mother and baby. In Lindé's view, the epistle "weaves together birth and death in a very beautiful, sensitive, and gripping way". 
Carina Burman comments in her biography that pregnancy and childbirth appear in various places in Bellman's work, most poetically in epistle No. 43 with Ulla Winblad in the birthing-bed; in the most burlesque detail in his 1783 book-length poem Bacchi Tempel, "where Ulla after Movitz's death is to give birth to a new little Movitz". She notes the grim reality of the semi-prostitution among tavern women; if they became pregnant, the best they could hope for was for the child to be given board and lodging by a midwife, and for the father to make a one-off payment in support. 

Jennie Nell, writing for the Bellman Society, describes epistles 35 ("Bröderna fara väl vilse ibland") and 43 as undoubtedly the most radical and innovative of Bellman's songs. They were, she states, often chosen by female singers in the 20th century, picking up on Fredman's "perplexed and troubled" voice. Tim Berndtsson, writing on Populär poesi, comments that despite Bellman's reputation for humour, some of the best-known epistles like No. 35, No. 43, and No. 81 "Märk hur vår skugga" do not lend themselves to cheap humour. Instead, writes Berndtsson, they have an aesthetic beauty which has stood the test of time. 

Johan Stenström writes that most of the epistles are full of noise, whether it is the sound of busy taverns or all the noises of nature with bulls roaring, horses neighing, and dogs barking, while in No. 42, the only winter epistle, "wolves howl everywhere"; and the pagan gods join in, with Jove shaking the world with his thunder in epistle 80, "Liksom en Herdinna, högtids klädd". Epistle No. 43 is one of the quietest of the epistles, since like the erotic No. 72, "Glimmande Nymf!", its subject "demands silence and concentration".

The epistle ends with the famous line "Masken dold i blomman bådar blommans död" (The worm hidden in the flower bodes the flower's death"). The line has a double entendre; the scholar of literature  stated that the worm here was a phallic symbol, and that the flower had the same metaphorical meaning as the "blomsterskål" (lit: "bowl of flowers") which Chloris may show Movitz in the next epistle, No. 44, if he "Drives in Bacchus's furrows / Up to Fröja's myrtle gate" and wisely follows the advice to "Drink no more than you can hold". 
Burman states that the epistle's bleak ending is a description of birth, "which simultaneously becomes a description both of orgasm – the little death – and real death", without the usual exhortations to love and drunkenness.
Bellman was here following in a tradition of ambiguous endings to poems, such as 's erotically humorous epigrams.

Epistle No. 43 has been recorded by Cornelis Vreeswijk on his 1971 album Spring mot Ulla, Spring!; by Fred Åkerström on his 1977 album Vila vid denna källa; and by the actor Mikael Samuelson on his 1990 album Sjunger Fredmans Epistlar.

See also 
 The Sick Rose

Notes

References

Sources 

 
 
 
  (contains the most popular Epistles and Songs, in Swedish, with sheet music)

External links 

 Text of Epistle 43 at Bellman.net

1773 compositions
Swedish songs
Fredmans epistlar